William George Iacono is an American psychologist known for his research using behavior genetic methodologies, such as twin and adoption studies, to study the development of common mental disorders and substance abuse. He has also researched the relationship between substance use and cognitive impairment among adolescents. He is a Distinguished McKnight University Professor in the Department of Psychology at the University of Minnesota, where he is also the co-director, with Matt McGue, of the Minnesota Center for Twin and Family Research. Before joining the faculty of the University of Minnesota in 1985, he was an associate professor at the University of British Columbia.

References

External links

Living people
University of Minnesota faculty
Behavior geneticists
21st-century American psychologists
Academic staff of the University of British Columbia
Carnegie Mellon University alumni
University of Minnesota alumni
Year of birth missing (living people)